Salted Nut Roll is a candy bar made by the Pearson's Candy Company of Saint Paul, Minnesota and is available in the Midwestern United States.

Description
It has a nougat center that is surrounded in a layer of caramel and then covered with salted Virginia peanuts.  Pearson's use of reduced lactose whey makes this confection easier to digest for lactose-sensitive individuals. The Salted Nut Roll is available in a variety of sizes and has had chocolate-covered limited editions and there have been non-seasonal spin-off products such as the Salted Pecan Roll. Seasonal editions include Spicy, Cinnamon Churro, Apple Pie, and Pumpkin Spice

History
The Salted Nut Roll was introduced by Pearson's during the Great Depression in 1933, a year after the PayDay bar was introduced, and entered into a market that included various types of nut roll candies.  After the introduction the name was changed to the Choo Choo Bar to be distinguishable among competitors, but was eventually changed back.

References

External links
 Candy Blog review
 Official product page
 DECKED Partnership Press Release
 Candy Industry News Article

Candy bars
Peanut dishes
Brand name snack foods
Products introduced in 1933
Pearson's Candy Company brands